Rat Rock, also known as Umpire Rock, is an outcrop of Manhattan schist which protrudes from the bedrock in Central Park, Manhattan, New York City. It is named after the rats that used to swarm there at night. It is located near the southwest corner of the park, south of the Heckscher Ballfields near the alignments of 62nd Street and Seventh Avenue. The rock has striations caused by glaciation.

Boulderers congregate there, sometimes as many as fifty per day. Some are regulars such as Yukihiko Ikumori, a gardener from the West Village who is known as the spiritual godfather of the rock. Others are just passing through, such as tourists and visitors who learn about the climbing spot from the Internet and word of mouth. Experienced climbers such as Ikumori often show neophytes good routes and techniques.  More experienced outsiders may be disappointed as the quality of the stone is poor, the setting is gloomy and the climbs present so little challenge that it has been called "one of America's most pathetic boulders".  

The park police formerly ticketed climbers who climbed more than a few feet up the rock.  The City Climbers Club approached the park authorities and, by working to provide safety features such as wood chips around the base, they were able to legalize climbing there.

References

External links 

 Bouldering in Central Park
 RatRock @ ClimbNYC.com

Central Park
Climbing areas of the United States
Stones